Emerald Plaza is a building in San Diego, California. Tied with The Pinnacle Marina Tower, it has a height of 450 ft (137 m). Located in the Columbia district of Downtown San Diego, Emerald Plaza is a 30-story building with a clustered hexagonal roof, designed by architects C.W. Kim Architects & Planners.

History & Design
Emerald Plaza finished construction in 1990. At the time of its construction, one architectural critic called it "pretentious" and "discordant" with the surrounding buildings, as well as writing the building "... looks like a futuristic experiment, which is a fine thing on the drafting board but may look peculiar along staid Broadway."

"Emerald Plaza’s hexagonal design allows for the maximum number of guestrooms and offices with views, as well as minimizes wasted space typical to rectangular buildings.  Further more, this design utilizes angled window sills, which reflect ambient sunlight into the building, reducing lighting requirements.  The Emerald Plaza was built in 1990 at a cost of $150 million.  It consists of a steel frame structure with an exterior combination of granite stone panels and reflective glass set in a custom Kynar green aluminum window framing system.   The structure itself is balanced on a 9-foot deep concrete block which acts like a floating device, allowing the building ebb and flow, mimicking the movement of water. This technique makes it one of the most stable structures in San Diego."

"The tallest tower is 30 stories and 400 feet tall and the structure’s eight rooftops are angled at 33 degrees to match San Diego’s latitude."

Ownership
In June 2004, the building, along with the Comerica Building and Golden Eagle Plaza were sold to Triple Net Properties. As part of the deal, Emerald Plaza was sold for $100.94 million. Without any renovation, the building was sold again in November 2005 when RREEF paid $123 million.

Hotel
The Westin San Diego, formerly the Wyndham Emerald Plaza Hotel, is a 4-diamond hotel with 436 rooms in one of the towers. The hotel is served by The Grill, serving Californian cuisine, and the rooms start on the fourth floor up to the Presidential Suite on the 25th (since remodeled following acquisition by Westin). The ballroom and conference facilities cover an area of 22,000 square feet, and the hotel also contains a law library. On the third floor are the "war rooms", which contains executive conference rooms with space for administrative and paralegal staff.

See also
List of tallest buildings in San Diego

References

External links 
Emerald Plaza at Emporis.com
Emerald Plaza at SkyscraperPage.com
Emerald Plaza History

Office buildings completed in 1990
Skyscraper office buildings in San Diego
Hotels in San Diego
Hotels established in 1991
Hotel buildings completed in 1990
1991 establishments in California